Cover Two is a studio album of cover versions by American musician Joan As Police Woman. It was released on May 1, 2020, under PIAS Recordings. The album is Joan's second album of cover versions, and is titled as a sequel to Cover (2009). The album cover itself is an homage to Canadian band Loverboy's 1981 album Get Lucky.

Critical reception
Cover Two was met with generally favorable reviews from critics. At Metacritic, which assigns a weighted average rating out of 100 to reviews from mainstream publications, this release received an average score of 78, based on 5 reviews.

Track listing

References

2020 albums
Joan as Police Woman albums
PIAS Recordings albums
Covers albums